The 3rd constituency of the Manche (French: Troisième circonscription de la Manche) is a French legislative constituency in the Manche département. Like the other 576 French constituencies, it elects one MP using the two-round system, with a run-off if no candidate receives over 50% of the vote in the first round.

Description

The 3rd Constituency of the Manche covers a large central part of the department including a stretch of the Atlantic coastline. The constituency lies south of Cherbourg and west of Saint-Lô.

Before 2012 the constituency consistently returned conservative deputies from the mainstream RPR and its successor party the UMP. At the 2012 election the seat swung to the Socialist Party candidate Stéphane Travert, who was subsequently elected on the En Marche! ticket at the 2017 election.

Assembly members

Election results

2022

 
 
 
 
 
 
 
|-
| colspan="8" bgcolor="#E9E9E9"|
|-

2017

 
 
 
 
 
 
|-
| colspan="8" bgcolor="#E9E9E9"|
|-

2012

 
 
 
 
 
 
 
|-
| colspan="8" bgcolor="#E9E9E9"|
|-

References

3